High Rock Mountain may refer to:

 High Rock Mountain (Arkansas) in Arkansas, USA
 High Rock Mountain (Kentucky) in Kentucky, USA
 High Rock Mountain (Missouri) in Missouri, USA
 High Rock Mountain (New Jersey) in New Jersey, USA
 High Rock Mountain (North Carolina) in North Carolina, USA
 High Rock Mountain (Oregon) in Oregon, USA
 High Rock Mountain (Washington) in Washington, USA